Afro-Nicaraguans are  Nicaraguans of Sub-Saharan African descent. Five main distinct ethnic groups exist: The Creoles who descend from Anglo-Caribbean countries and many of whom still speak Nicaragua English Creole, the Miskito Sambus descendants of Spanish slaves and indigenous Central Americans who still speak Miskito and/or Miskito Coast Creole, the Garifunas descendents of Zambos (Caribs, Arawaks, and shipwrecked maroons) expelled from St. Vincent who speak Garifuna, the Rama Cay zambos a subset of the Miskito who speak Rama Cay Creole, and the descendants of those enslaved by the Spanish.

History 
The first African slaves were transported to Nicaragua were taken by Gil González Dávila, who purchased them for 300 pesos in Panama from Pedrarias Dávila´s colonial administrator. From there they took eleven enslaved individuals to the newly founded Nicaragua. They were already baptized before being taken to Nicaragua. In 1531, the council of Leon, asked the King of Spain for authorization to extract a thousand slaves, tax free, to give to the neighbors. The council of Granada, Spain – in November 24, 1544 – asked the same authorization to import 50 people to enslave them in the opening of the "rapids of the drain". Also, Spanish colonists, who could no longer enslave the Native Americans following the New Laws of 1542, required workers in their newly formed haciendas. So, from 1558, Bishop Lazaro Carrasco, meeting with the Native Americans "almost all consumed" and less than a hundred Spanish neighbors without enough real entries, asked the King license to import 600 people of African descent to enslave them, they would remedy the situation, i.e., could produced the earth.≈

The number of the first African people enslaved were imported must have been considerable, perhaps thousands. Because most Spanish who emigrated to America were men, soldiers and colonists took indigenous and African women as partners and concubines. As early as the 18th century, most people who were enslaved born in the territory were mulattoes. According to colonial documents, people of African descent who had been enslaved came from such ethnic groups such as Arara, mainly the Ewe and Fon from Ghana, Togo, Benin, the Yoruba people from Yorubaland, now located in Nigeria, Togo and Benin,  the Ashanti (of Ghana), those from what is now known as "Angola", the Congo region, the "mina" and "Mandinga" of the Gambia. The proportion of men and women slaves were very similar.

Miscegenation caused a large release of enslaved people. Thus emerged middle classes formed by Zambo, mulatto and quadroon (those with a quarter African blood) and other mixtures. By 1820, persons of some African descent made up 84 percent of the population.

But many of them were kept as slaves, probably hundreds. Thus, during the first half of the 17th century, many of the slaves were used in the indigo mills. Since the 17th century, several groups of slaves rebelled against their owners and migrated to other places and settled in small clandestine colonies, free from Spanish rule. Therefore, these slavesm the "Cimarrons" (cimarrones) were affected by several royal orders issued against them. One of them agreed to raise an army against those colonies and return enslaved people to their owners. This law was fulfilled in Nicaragua.

However, the Spanish were not the only people to import people to make them slaves to Nicaragua. The English, who were colonists on the coast of Nicaragua since 1633, also imported groups of people to enslave since the late 17th century. The English began cultivating sugar cane and indigo around Bluefields and on the banks of the Rio Coco, which were labor-intensive crops. The slaves were also used for cotton plantations and especially for cutting mahogany. As in the case of slaves imported by the Spanish, the African slaves of the English mixed with the Miskito, Sumu and Rama indigenous peoples of the area.

Most of “caseros” (derived of Spanish "Casa" -house- i.e., man assigned to domestic service in the homes of Creoles and Spaniards) enslaved African and mulatto people also performed agricultural and cattle, but were not the main operating system. Finally, following independence, slavery was abolished by the decree of the Constituent Assembly of April 17, 1824.

However, to early 19th century arrived slaves from Jamaica to the Nicaraguan Caribbean coasts, when the region was a British protectorate. They became "creoles". More late, in 1832, some groups of Garifuna people came to the Caribbean Coast of Nicaragua from Honduras for fighting for his land, be recognized as ethnic and preserve their cultural identity. However, the Garifuna were met with fierce opposition from the Miskito people, as indigenous of this territories,  and of the Creole, who forced to them to accept English as the language for business transactions and a half for insertion and recognition in society.

Communities 
Most enslaved people imported by the Spanish to Nicaragua were mixed during the colonial era and their mulatto and Quadroon descendants also re-mixed with the majority indigenous, mestizo and white. For this reason, today, the descendants of black enslaved people were imported by the Spanish in Nicaragua are mostly white people or Amerindian with some black ancestors. So, most Black Nicaraguans are descended from the enslaved people were imported by the British and of the West Indian immigrants who arrived on the shores of the country since the 17th century.  Most Afro-Nicaraguans reside on the Caribbean coast of Nicaragua, which is also the vast and sparsely populated region, that had the British occupation from 1635 to 1860. The Afro-Nicaraguans are fundamentally divided into three groups, also present in Honduras: Creoles (majority group), Garifuna and Indigenous zambos. The Afro-Nicaraguan population is descended from enslaved people were exported from places as Panama, Nigeria, Saint Vincent and the Grenadines and Jamaica.

Indigenous zambos 
These are indigenous groups formed by the mixture of African descent and the Mayangna, Rama and Miskitos indigenous ethnic groups. Their African ancestors were enslaved Africans kidnapped and brought in bondage to Nicaragua by English settler colonizers on the coast of Nicaragua, in 1633. Since the late 17th century, when the British forced enslaved Africans to cultivate sugar cane and indigo around Bluefields and on the banks of the Rio Coco, there were imported the first enslaved Africans to do the arduous and dangerous work of the canefields. The slaves were also forced to labor in cotton plantations and especially in lumber extraction mahogany. The arrival of African slaves to the area facilitated the race mixtures between this group and the natives of the place, the aforementioned Miskito, Sumu and Rama. Thus, Sumo and Rama are zambos. While the Miskito are a mixture of Bawinka Amerindians, Africans, zambos (sumos "tawahkas"), and European.

Creoles 
They are mostly descendants of former slaves from Jamaica, who arrived in the region to early 19th century, when the region was a British protectorate and retained a rich indigenous culture. That is, are Creoles. The Nicaraguan Creole received from the English, their language, their religion and customs. Of old, the coastal rebutted the inability of the rest of Nicaraguans (Pacific) to understand their cultural identity, and although desde 1987 the Caribbean has a different territorial system (RAAN and RAAS), many sectors still consider themselves neglected by the central state and not yet given a move back legal, political, economic, religious and cultural life of the Caribbean Coast to the rest of Nicaragua.

Garifuna 
They live in the country's coasts. They are a mixture of Carib Amerindians and Afro-Caribbeans of the Saint Vicente island (unlike the Creoles), from where they were exported to the island of Roatan, Honduras, because  rebelled them against the English domain of the island. From there, they migrated to the Honduran coast, from where they spread to the rest of the Central American coast to Costa Rica.

The Garifuna came to the Caribbean Coast of Nicaragua in 1832 with the same objectives that motivated since its installation in the continental America (after the wreck of the slave ship in 1636 near the island of St. Vincent in the Lesser Antilles): fighting for his land, be recognized as ethnic and preserve their cultural identity. However, the Garifuna were met with fierce opposition from the Miskito, as indigenous of this territories,  and of Black Creole, who forced to them to accept English as the language for business transactions and a half for insertion and recognition in society, according to research on ethnicity in the Caribbean Nicaraguan,  of Silvio Araica Aguilar and Cleopatra Morales (May, 2000). The authors report that "the major contradictions between Creole and Garifuna, despite having the same ancestors African origin lies in the genealogy of its ethnic composition and thus the result of cultural syncretism"  (May, 2000). According to the Human Development Report of the United Nations to Central America in 2003, in Nicaragua would 2000 garífunas.

Nicaraguan coasts: a distinct region
The African slaves arrives to Nicaraguan Coast during the British commercial and political domain of the Nicaraguan coast (1524–1821), many of which were exported by the British themselves (except the Creoles).  In 1860 Great Britain and the United States sign a treaty, because international negotiations between the two countries developed. So, from 1894, England, abandons gradually the Caribbean coast, delivering in 1905, the territory to American companies, occupying the latter will last until 1930. After British withdrawal, on the Caribbean coast, it remains for 44 years as an autonomous region of Nicaragua, having its own laws and regulations until 1894, when President José Santos Zelaya said the reintegration of Moskitia to Nicaragua, developing monopolies for mestizos in the area and to U.S. interests, as well as replacing the name of the Mosquito Coast by the Department of Zelaya. Beyond this, the government encouraged a massive immigration of Nicaraguan mestizos, especially those engaged in military affairs, commercial, speculative and entrepreneurs. Immigrants and Nicaraguan government officials evicted from their lands to the indigenous Amerindians and Afro-descendants living in them and imposed heavy fines on the natives of the coast. In addition, the government abolished the laws of the region and built the Nicaraguan government institutions and structures, forming schools, police, government etc. This imposition of that such institutions were built, was made through the use of force. The most important result was the prohibition of education in English and their own languages, only languages spoken by the  population – indigenous population, Garifuna and Afro descendants- of this Nicaraguan area. It caused an abandonment of schools and colleges of the coast for generations. The Nicaraguan coast always remained economically dominated by American companies until the 1930s when U.S. companies were gradually replaced by capital of Somoza family and its allies until 1979 with the triumph of the Sandinista Revolution. In 1987, the Caribbean coast achieved autonomy from Nicaragua. The government, fearing the loss of the territory, divided it into two autonomous regions now known as the South Caribbean Coast Autonomous Region and North Caribbean Coast Autonomous Region, but internal conflicts remain

Notable Afro-Nicaraguans

Scharllette Allen, first Afro-Nicaraguan to be crowned Miss Nicaragua
June Beer, artist and poet 
Rudel Calero, footballer
David Green, MLB baseball player
Devern Hansack, MLB baseball player
Wilton López, MLB baseball player
 Hamilton West
Ricardo Mayorga, professional boxer

See also 

English settlement in Nicaragua

References

 
Ethnic groups in Nicaragua
Nicaraguan